Shir Mohammad Bazar or Shirmohammad Bazar may refer to:
 Shir Mohammad Bazar, Chabahar
 Shir Mohammad Bazar, Qasr-e Qand